Rıqloba (also, Rıqlaba, Ryglyba and Yagul’ba) is a village in the Astara Rayon of Azerbaijan.  The village forms part of the municipality of Hamoşam.

References 

Populated places in Astara District